The 2021 DTM Trophy is the second season of the DTM support series for GT cars eligible for E2-SH and E2-SC-class FIA categories. The series will be run by ITR, the association also organising the Deutsche Tourenwagen Masters. The championship ran as part of selected DTM race weekends in 2021, commencing in Monza on 19 June and finishing on 3 October at the Hockenheimring.

Teams and drivers 
The following teams and drivers compete in the 2021 DTM Trophy. All teams compete with tyres supplied by Hankook.

Calendar

Results and Standings

Season summary

Scoring system 
Points were awarded to the top ten classified finishers as follows:

Additionally, the top three placed drivers in qualifying also received points:

Drivers' championship

Teams' championship

Notes

References 

DTM Trophy